Zach Goodwin (born September 8, 1995) is a United States Virgin Islands international footballer who plays as a midfielder and is currently studying at the Susquehanna University.

International career
Goodwin made his senior international debut for the US Virgin Islands in a 2–1 victory over Sint Maarten.
He also holds the record for most games participated resulting in a 0-0 tie.

Career statistics

International

References

External links
 CaribbeanFootballDatabase Profile

1995 births
Living people
United States Virgin Islands soccer players
United States Virgin Islands international soccer players
Association football midfielders
Susquehanna River Hawks men's soccer players